The 2020 season was the Washington Spirit's seventh season, competing in the National Women's Soccer League, the top division of women's soccer in the United States.

The season was slated to begin on April 18, 2020 but was postponed due to the COVID-19 pandemic. Ultimately, the NWSL season was cancelled due to the pandemic. Th club participated in the NWSL Challenge Cup and the NWSL Fall series which were held in lieu of the regular season. The Challenge Cup was held behind closed doors at the neutral venue of Zions Bank Stadium in Herriman, Utah. The Spirit reached the Quarterfinals of the Challenge Cup and finished in third place in the Fall Series. Combined across all matches, the Spirit had the second best record of matches played during the 2020 season.

Club

Roster
The first-team roster of Washington Spirit.

 (FP) 

 (INT)

 (INT)

 (FP) = Federation player
 (INT) = International roster player

Team management

Competitions

Preseason
All preseason competitions were cancelled on March 12, 2020 due to the COVID-19 pandemic in the United States.

Regular season

Results summary

Results by round

NWSL Challenge Cup

Standings

Results by round

Preliminary round

Knockout round

NWSL Fall series 
The Spirit were placed into the Northeast pod of the NWSL Fall series with the Chicago Red Stars and Sky Blue FC. The spirit played each team twice, once home and once away. Home Matches were hosted at Segra field without spectators.

Standings

Statistics

Appearances and goals

Goalkeepers

Transfers

In

Out

Draft picks
Draft picks are not automatically signed to the team roster. Only those who are signed to a contract will be listed as transfers in. Only trades involving draft picks and executed during the 2020 NWSL College Draft will be listed in the notes.

References

2020 National Women's Soccer League season